The following radio stations broadcast on FM frequency 97.3 MHz:

Argentina
 Arenales in Lanteri, Santa Fe
 Boing in Rosario, Santa Fe
 Ciudad in Corral de Bustos, Córdoba
 radió express 87.7/,Córdoba capital
 Estación in Marcos Juárez, Córdoba
 La 97 in Mar del Plata, Buenos Aires
 La Caterva in Buenos Aires
 La Punta in La Punta, San Luis
 La sol in Santa Isabel, La Pampa
 Light in San Juan
 LRH 370 Horizonte in Montecarlo, Misiones
 Manantial in Coronel Dorrego, Buenos Aires
 Radio María in Tres Lomas, Buenos Aires
 Radio María in Villa Cura Brochero, Córdoba
 Spacial in Catamarca
 LRI358 UTN in Rafaela, Santa Fe
 ZONYDO in Buenos Aires

Australia
 97.3 ABC Illawarra in Illawarra, New South Wales
 ABC Classic FM in Griffith, New South Wales
 4BFM in Brisbane, Queensland
 3HCR in Omeo, Victoria

Latvia
Radio Marija Latvija

Canada (Channel 247)
 CBAZ-FM in Sheet Harbour, Nova Scotia
 CBON-FM-19 in Nipigon, Ontario
 CFJO-FM in Thetford-Mines, Quebec
 CHBM-FM in Toronto, Ontario
 CHGA-FM in Maniwaki, Quebec
 CHWV-FM in Saint John, New Brunswick
 CIPR-FM in Pigeon River, Ontario
 CIRK-FM in Edmonton, Alberta
 CJAQ-FM-2 in Invermere, British Columbia
 CJCI-FM in Prince George, British Columbia
 CJIV-FM in Dryden, Ontario
 CJRG-FM-2 in Fontenelle, Quebec
 CJRM-FM in Labrador City, Newfoundland and Labrador
 CKLR-FM in Courtenay, British Columbia
 CKUA-FM-3 in Medicine Hat, Alberta
 CKUJ-FM in Kuujjuaq, Quebec
 VF2136 in Yellowknife, Northwest Territories
 VF2332 in Beardys First Nation, Saskatchewan
 VF2409 in Thunderchild First Nation, Saskatchewan
 VF7014 in Saskatoon, Saskatchewan

Malaysia
 Kelantan FM in Central Kelantan

Mexico
 XHAGC-FM in Aguascalientes, Aguascalientes
 XHCHI-FM in Chihuahua, Chihuahua
 XHCSCA-FM in Rioverde, San Luis Potosí
 XHDCC-FM in San Ildefonso, Tepeji del Río de Ocampo, Hidalgo
 XHECA-FM in Amecameca, Estado de México
 XHGF-FM in Gutiérrez Zamora, Veracruz
 XHGI-FM in Zacatipan, San Luis Potosí
 XHHIS-FM in Los Mochis, Sinaloa
 XHHCC-FM in Hércules, Coahuila
 XHNEZ-FM in Ciudad Nezahualcóyotl, State of Mexico
 XHOCU-FM in Ocumicho, Michoacán
 XHORE-FM in Morelia, Michoacán
 XHOV-FM in Ixhuatlancillo, Veracruz
 XHPETO-FM in Peto, Yucatán
 XHPMAH-FM in Mahahual, Quintana Roo
 XHRAC-FM in Campeche, Campeche
 XHSOS-FM in El Sifón (Agua Prieta), Sonora
 XHSPN-FM in Santiago Pinotepa Nacional, Oaxaca
 XHSR-FM in Monterrey, Nuevo León
 XHUAU-FM in Huautla de Jiménez, Oaxaca
 XHVB-FM in Villahermosa, Tabasco
 XHVZ-FM in Cuernavaca, Morelos
 XHZR-FM in Zaragoza, Coahuila

New Zealand
 Coast (New Zealand radio) in Bay of Plenty

United Kingdom

England
LBC 97.3: London

Scotland
97.3 Forth One: Edinburgh

United States (Channel 247)
 KAJA (FM) in San Antonio, Texas
  in Gillette, Wyoming
  in Boulder, Colorado
 KBHJ in Blythe, California
 KCMK-LP in La Rue, Texas
 KDEW-FM in De Witt, Arkansas
  in Duluth, Minnesota
 KDNZ in Pecos, Texas
  in Anchorage, Alaska
 KEBF-LP in Morro Bay, California
 KEPW-LP in Eugene, Oregon
 KFMR in VIrden, New Mexico
 KGRR in Epworth, Iowa
  in New London, Iowa
 KHEL-LP in Rogers, Arkansas
 KHKI in Des Moines, Iowa
  in Tacoma, Washington
 KJAP-LP in Edinburg, Texas
 KJAT-LP in Sulphur Springs, Arkansas
  in Bastrop, Louisiana
 KJUK-LP in Hooks, Texas
  in Garden City, Kansas
 KKNG-FM in Blanchard, Oklahoma
 KKRC-FM in Sioux Falls, South Dakota
  in Davenport, Washington
  in Santa Fe, New Mexico
  in Blackfoot, Idaho
  in San Francisco, California
  in Lee's Summit, Missouri
  in New Deal, Texas
  in Kaplan, Louisiana
 KMEI-LP in Kamiah, Idaho
  in Redding, California
 KNEH-LP in Helena, Montana
  in Blair, Nebraska
 KOLC in Carson City, Nevada
 KPSQ-LP in Fayetteville, Arkansas
 KPUY in Garwood, Texas
  in Waskom, Texas
 KQSB-LP in Paris, Texas
  in Aurora, Nebraska
 KRJK in Lamont, California
  in Wailea-Makena, Hawaii
  in Starbuck, Minnesota
 KSHR-FM in Coquille, Oregon
 KTCM in Madison, Missouri
 KTNG in Connerville, Oklahoma
 KWFN in San Diego, California
  in Springfield, Missouri
  in Marble Hill, Missouri
 KZAC-LP in Sacramento, California
 WAEV in Savannah, Georgia
 WAUF-LP in Auburn, Alabama
 WBIC-LP in Wilson, North Carolina
 WBRJ-LP in Baton Rouge, Louisiana
 WCGY-FM in Jefferson, New Hampshire
 WDBW-LP in Port Saint Joe, Florida
  in Reed City, Michigan
 WENJ in Millville, New Jersey
 WENV-LP in Gainesboro, Tennessee
  in Miami, Florida
  in Sumrall, Mississippi
  in Flora, Mississippi
 WFYR in Elmwood, Illinois
  in Newport News, Virginia
 WGVD-LP in Dwight, Illinois
 WHIH-LP in Whitesboro, New York
 WHPW-LP in Harpswell, Maine
 WHRC-LP in Chippewa Falls, Wisconsin
  in Orange, Massachusetts
  in New Bedford, Massachusetts
  in Jackson, Kentucky
 WJWC-LP in Grand Rapids, Michigan
  in Oak Harbor, Ohio
 WJZK-LP in Ft. Walton Beach, Florida
  in North Wilkesboro, North Carolina
 WKJQ-FM in Parsons, Tennessee
 WKSO (FM) in Natchez, Mississippi
  in Wheeling, West Virginia
  in Fort Wayne, Indiana
 WMFJ-LP in Augusta, Georgia
  in Essexville, Michigan
 WMNX in Wilmington, North Carolina
 WMYY in Schoharie, New York
  in Rio Grande, Puerto Rico
  in Spangler, Pennsylvania
 WPYA in Gardendale, Alabama
 WQFB-LP in Flagler Beach, Florida
 WRNW in Milwaukee, Wisconsin
  in Bainbridge, Georgia
 WRAN (FM) in Taylorville, Illinois
 WRIR-LP in Richmond, Virginia
  in Carmi, Illinois
  in Harrisburg, Pennsylvania
  in Micanopy, Florida
 WSWO-LP in Huber Heights, Ohio
 WTNV in Tiptonville, Tennessee
 WUUQ in South Pittsburg, Tennessee
 WUVI-LP in John Brewers Bay, U.S. Virgin Islands
 WWCC-LP in West Lafayette, Indiana
 WYGY in Fort Thomas, Kentucky
  in Ithaca, New York
  in Wurtsboro, New York
  in Litchfield, Connecticut
 WZVZ-LP in Six Mile, South Carolina

Vietnam
Can Tho radio, Can Tho city

References

Lists of radio stations by frequency